Puntland, officially Puntland State of Somalia, is a Federal Member State in northeastern Somalia. The capital Of Puntland Is Garowe.

Puntland is an autonomous State in Somalia. Its location is the tip of the Horn.

A third of Somalia's population lives in the territory, which contains about a third of the nation's geographical area.

The name "Puntland" is derived from the Land of Punt mentioned by ancient Egyptian sources. However, the exact location of the fabled territory is still a mystery. Many studies suggest that the Land of Punt was located in Somalia, whereas others propose that it was situated elsewhere.

The following outline is provided as an overview of and topical guide to Puntland. Puntland consists of 5 regions and the town of Buhotle.  Puntland's current president is Said Abdullahi Danni.

General reference
Common English regional name: Puntland
Common endonym(s): Puntlaand
Official endonym(s): أرض البنط
ISO country codes:  See the Outline of Somalia
ISO region codes:  See the Outline of Somalia
Internet country code top-level domain: .so

Geography of Puntland

Geography of Puntland
Location — Puntland is situated within the following regions:
Eastern Hemisphere and Southern Hemisphere
Africa
East Africa
Horn of Africa
Somalia – see also States and regions of Somalia
Time zone(s): EAT

Population of Puntland: 3,900,000 - th most populous
Area of Puntland: (124,320 km2), (48,000 mi2),
(212,510 km2), (82,050 mi2) Including Mudug And Sool Regions
Atlas of Somalia

Environment of Puntland

Climate of Puntland

Natural geographic features of Puntland
Glaciers of Puntland: None

Regions of Puntland

Administrative divisions of Puntland

Administrative regions of Puntland

Bari
Karkaar
Haylaan
Guardafui
Nugaal
Mudug
Sool
Buhoodle District

Districts of Puntland
Districts, by administrative Of Puntland region:
 Districts of Guardafui
Alula District
Baargaal District
Districts Of Bari
Bosaso District
Iskushuban District
Qandala District
Districts Of Karkaar
Qardho District
Bayla District
Waiye District
District of Haylaan
Badhan District
Dhahar District
Laasqoray District
Districts of Nugaal
Garoowe District
Eyl District
Taleex District
Districts of Mudug, Central Somalia 
Gaalkacyo District
Hobyo District
Harardheere District
Galdogob District
Jariban District
Burtinle District
Districts  of Sool Disputed territories Somaliland and Puntland
Las Anod District
Xudun District
Aynaba District

Cities in Puntland
Aluula
Badhan
Bargal
Bayla
Bosaso
Buran
Dangorayo
Dhahar
Faladhyaale
Eyl
Jalam
Galgala
Hafun
Hadaftimo
Lasqoray
xingalol
Xidda
Iskushuban
Qandala
Qardho
Taleex
Waiye
Yalho

Government and politics of Puntland

Politics of Puntland
Form of government: national  autonomous presidential republic
Capital of Puntland: Garowe

Branches of the government of Puntland

Executive branch of the government of Puntland
Head of state: President of Puntland
Head of government: President of Puntland

Legislative branch of the government of Puntland
Parliament of Puntland

Judicial branch of the government of Puntland

Court system of Puntland
Supreme Court of Puntland

Foreign relations of Puntland
Diplomatic missions of Puntland

International organization membership
None (regional administration)

Law and order in Puntland
Human rights in Puntland
LGBT rights in Puntland

Military of Puntland
Puntland Security Force

History of Puntland
History of Puntland
Majeerteen Sultanate
Aromata
Mosylon
Opone

Culture of Puntland
National symbols of Puntland
Coat of arms of Puntland
Flag of Puntland
Religion in Puntland
Islam in Puntland
Demonyms of Puntland
Puntish, Puntian, Puntite, Puntlander

Economy and infrastructure of Puntland

Economy of Puntland
Communications in Puntland
 Media in Puntland
Puntland TV and Radio
Garowe Online
Puntland Post
Radio Garowe
Companies of Puntland
Golis Telecom Somalia
Bosaso Tannery
Energy in Puntland
Oil exploration in Puntland
Transport in Puntland
 Roads in Puntland
Garowe-Bosaso Highway
 Seaports in Puntland
Port of Bosaso
 Airports in Puntland
Bosaso International Airport
Garowe International Airport

Education in Puntland
 Puntland State University
 Admas University College–Garowe
East Africa University
Bosaso University
RedSea University
Sahal University

See also

Outline of Somalia
Outline of geography
Outline of Somaliland

References

External links

Official Website: Government of Puntland

 1
Outlines of geography and places
Wikipedia outlines